"V-2 Schneider" is a largely instrumental song written by David Bowie in 1977 for the album "Heroes". It was a tribute to Florian Schneider, co-founder of the band Kraftwerk, whom Bowie acknowledged as a significant influence at the time. The title also referenced the V-2 rocket, the first ballistic missile, which had been developed for the German Army during World War II, and whose design (and engineers) played a key role in the American space program.

The only words sung are those in the title, initially distorted by phasing. Musically, the track is unusual for the off-beat saxophone work by Bowie, who kicked off his part on the wrong note, but continued regardless.

"V-2 Schneider" achieved considerable circulation as the B-side of Heroes, released prior to the album, but was not played on the subsequent 1978 concert tour, its first live rendition occurring 20 years after it was recorded (see Live versions).

Mojo magazine listed it as Bowie's 95th best track in 2015.

Live versions
A live version recorded at Paradiso, Amsterdam in June 1997, was released as the B-side of the single "Pallas Athena" in August 1997, under the name Tao Jones Index. This version also appeared on the bonus disc for the Digibook Expanded Edition of Earthling.

Other releases
 It was first released as the B-side of Heroes in September 1977. It also appeared on the German and French versions of the single, and on a four-track Australian single featuring all three versions of Heroes.
 It appeared on the compilation Chameleon (Australia and New Zealand 1979).
 The film Christiane F. and its soundtrack featured the song.
 It was released as a picture disc in the RCA Life Time picture disc set.
 It was included on the Bowie instrumental album All Saints.

Cover versions
 Philip Glass – "Heroes" Symphony (1996)
 Mandarins Drum and Bugle Corps – 2000 repertoire
 Shearwater – as part of a live performance of the entire Berlin Trilogy for WNYC (2018)

Notes

David Bowie songs
1977 songs
Songs written by David Bowie
Song recordings produced by David Bowie
Song recordings produced by Tony Visconti